Minden Day is a regimental anniversary celebrated on 1 August by certain units of the British Army.                                 It commemorates the participation of the forerunners of the regiments in the Battle of Minden during the Seven Years' War on that date in 1759.

The celebration of the day involves the wearing of "Minden Roses" on the regimental head dress, and in the case of the infantry regiments, the decoration of the regimental colours with garlands of roses. This recalls that the regiments wore wild roses at the battle that they had plucked from the hedgerows as they advanced to engage the enemy.

Minden Day is celebrated by:
 Suffolk Regiment.
12 (Minden) Battery, 12 Regiment (Royal Artillery)
32 (Minden) Battery, 16 Regiment Royal Artillery
The Royal Scots Borderers, The Royal Regiment of Scotland, as successors to the 25th Regiment of Foot (King's Own Scottish Borderers)
1st Battalion, The Royal Anglian Regiment, successor to the 12th Regiment of Foot
HQ Company, 3rd Battalion, The Royal Anglian Regiment (Army Reserve)
The Royal Regiment of Fusiliers, successor the 20th Regiment of Foot 
The Royal Welsh, successors to the 23rd Regiment of Foot
The Princess of Wales's Royal Regiment, successors to the 37th Regiment of Foot
3rd and 5th Battalions The Rifles Regiment as successors of The Light Infantry, successors to the 51st Regiment of Foot
 The North Saskatchewan Regiment [Reserve Canadian Army] successors to the Saskatoon Light Infantry in honour of a regimental twinning with a British Army Regiment. The N.Sask.R. wears the white rose. 

The colours of roses varies: red and yellow roses are worn by most of the units (including the Royal Regiment of Fusiliers and the Royal Anglians - both of whom continue to mark Minden as one of their most important regimental days), the PWRR wear a single red rose, whilst a white rose is favoured by the Light Infantry. In some cases this reflects parts of the regimental recruiting areas: the PWRR have strong links with Hampshire (whose badge is a red rose) and the Light Infantry is associated with part of Yorkshire (represented by a white rose).

In 1975, August 1 was adopted as Yorkshire Day, partly to reflect the presence of Yorkshire soldiers at the battle.

Minden Day is commemorated in the English folk song "Lowlands of Holland", which dates to the time of the Seven Years' War. Like most English folk songs, the song has numerous variants. One version, which is prevalent in Suffolk, home of 12th Regiment of Foot (1st Battalion Royal Anglian Regiment), contains the verse:

"My love across the ocean
Wears a scarlet coat so fair,
With a musket at his shoulder
And roses in his hair".

Officers who have not previously attended The Royal Regiment of Fusiliers Officers' Mess Minden Day dinner are presented with a rose to be eaten. The names of those who have done so are then recorded in the Mess Records.

See also

Trafalgar Day
St Crispin's day
Oak Apple Day

External links
32 (Minden) Battery (Ministry of Defence)
Royal Anglian Regiment Museum
Minden Day marks the formation of the royal Scots Borderers (Defence Internet)
Traditions of The Light Infantry (Ministry of Defence)
Princess of Wales's Royal Regiment -history

British Army traditions
August observances
English traditions